A cricket team from England organised by the Marylebone Cricket Club (MCC) toured India from 5 October 1951 to 2 March 1952. During this tour England team also played first class matches in Pakistan and Ceylon. In the Test matches, the side was known as "England"; in other matches, it was known as "MCC".

The Test series was drawn 1-1, with three matches being drawn.

Background 
It was reported in April 1950 that the MCC would tour India, Pakistan and Ceylon in the 1951–52 season. The squad would play games over three-and-a-half months in India, over a month in Pakistan and over fifteen days in Ceylon.

The English team

 Nigel Howard (captain)
 Donald Carr (vice-captain)
 Don Brennan
 Tom Graveney
 Malcolm Hilton
 Don Kenyon
 Eddie Leadbeater
 Frank Lowson
 Cyril Poole
 Dusty Rhodes
 Fred Ridgway
 Jack Robertson
 Derek Shackleton
 Dick Spooner
 Brian Statham
 Roy Tattersall
 Allan Watkins

The manager was Geoffrey Howard. The team was announced in late July 1951. Poole replaced Jack Ikin, who was injured, before the team left. Leadbeater replaced Rhodes, who was forced to return home with an injury, early in the tour.

Many of England's leading players made themselves unavailable for the tour, and the resultant team was widely regarded as a "second team". Eight of the touring team – Howard, Carr, Leadbeater, Kenyon, Poole, Rhodes, Ridgway and Spooner – had no Test experience, while none of the team had played more than nine Tests. None of the team had toured Australia and New Zealand in the Test series of 1950–51.

Test matches

1st Test

2nd Test

3rd Test

4th Test

5th Test

This was India's first Test victory, after 20 years and 25 Tests.

References

External links
 Tour home at ESPNcricinfo
 England to India 1951-52 at test-cricket-tours.co.uk
 

1951 in English cricket
1952 in English cricket
1951 in Indian cricket
1952 in Indian cricket
1951 in Pakistani cricket
1952 in Ceylon
1951-52
1951
1952
International cricket competitions from 1945–46 to 1960
Sri Lankan cricket seasons from 1880–81 to 1971–72
Indian cricket seasons from 1945–46 to 1969–70
Pakistani cricket seasons from 1947–48 to 1969–70